The 2013 Varsity Cup was contested from 4 February to 8 April 2013. The tournament (also known as the FNB Varsity Cup presented by Steinhoff International for sponsorship reasons) was the sixth season of the Varsity Cup, an annual inter-university rugby union competition featuring eight South African universities.

No team was relegated to the second-tier Varsity Shield competition for 2014.

Scoring
All four 2013 Varsity Rugby competitions will use a different scoring system to the regular system. Tries will be worth five points as usual, but conversions will be worth three points, while penalties and drop goals will only be worth two points.

Varsity Cup

There was no relegation at the end of 2013.

Varsity Shield

There was no promotion at the end of 2013.

Promotion/Relegation

There was no promotion or relegation at the end of 2013.

Young Guns

Competition Rules

There were eight participating universities in the 2013 Young Guns competition. These teams were divided into two pools (the FNB pool and the Steinhoff pool) and played the other teams in the pool once over the course of the season, either home or away.

Teams received four points for a win and two points for a draw. Bonus points were awarded to teams that scored four or more tries in a game, as well as to teams that lost a match by seven points or less. Teams were ranked by log points, then points difference (points scored less points conceded).

The top two teams in each pool qualified for the title play-offs. In the semi-finals, the teams that finished first had home advantage against the teams that finished second in their respective pools. The winners of these semi-finals played each other in the final.

Participating teams

Standings

Fixtures and results
The 2013 Varsity Cup Young Guns fixtures were as follows:

 All times are South African (GMT+2).

Regular season

Round one

Round two

Round three

Round four

Round Five

Play-Off Games

Semi-finals

Final

Honours

Koshuis Rugby Championship

Competition Rules
There were eight participating teams in the 2013 Koshuis Rugby Championship - the winners of the internal leagues of each of the eight Varsity Cup teams. These teams were divided into two pools (the Penny Pinchers pool and the Hertz pool) and played the other teams in the pool once over the course of the season, either home or away.

Teams received four points for a win and two points for a draw. Bonus points were awarded to teams that score four or more tries in a game, as well as to teams that lost a match by seven points or less. Teams were ranked by log points, then points difference (points scored less points conceded).

The top two teams in each pool qualified for the title play-offs. In the semi-finals, the teams that finished first had home advantage against the teams that finish second in their respective pools. The winners of these semi-finals played each other in the final.

Participating teams

Standings

Fixtures and results
The 2013 Koshuis Rugby Championship fixtures are as follows:

 All times are South African (GMT+2).

Regular season

Round one

Round two

Round three

Round four

Round Five

Play-Off Games

Semi-finals

Final

Honours

South African Universities
In April 2013, a South African Universities team was named, picked from players that played in Varsity Rugby in 2013, to play against  in Windhoek.

Squads
The team was named as follows:

Fixtures

See also
 Varsity Cup
 2013 Currie Cup Premier Division
 2013 Currie Cup First Division
 2013 Vodacom Cup

References

External links
 Official site

2013
2013 in South African rugby union
Varsity Rugby